Jeroboam was the first king of the separate northern kingdom of Israel.

Jeroboam may also refer to:

Jeroboam II, a later king of Israel
Jeroboam (unit), a traditional wine bottle unit of measure
By extension, a chamber pot
Trumpet (satellite), a United States spy satellite also known as JEROBOAM